Nomima szunyoghyi is a moth in the  family Dudgeoneidae. It is found in Tanzania.

References

Natural History Museum Lepidoptera generic names catalog

Endemic fauna of Tanzania
Dudgeoneidae
Moths described in 1965